111 Battalion was a motorised infantry unit of the South African Army.

History

Origin of the black battalions
By the late 1970s the South African government had abandoned its opposition to arming black soldiers.

By early 1979, the government approved a plan to form a number of regional African battalions, each with a particular ethnic identity, which would serve in their homeland or under regional SADF commands.

Development of the Lebowa Defence Force
Two additional Northern Sotho Battalions were established, the 117 and the 118.
Troops for 117 SA Battalion were recruited from the self-governing territory of Lebowa.

Higher Command
117 Battalion initially resorted under the command of Group 45 but was eventually transferred to Group 14 at Pietersburg.

The unit's HQ were situated in Soekmekaar with companies "deployed" in "steunpunte" or platoon base's throughout Lebowa. Alpha Company had its HQ in Seshego at the platoon one base, platoon two was based in Mankweng (close to the University of the North and Moria mountain of the ZCC) and platoon 3 was based in Ga-Matapo.

Disbandment
117 Battalion was converted into a training unit around 1997 and was finally amalgamated into 3 South African Infantry Battalion as part of the new SANDF.

Insignia

Notes

Peled, A. A question of Loyalty Military Manpower Policy in Multiethinic States, Cornell University Press, 1998,  Chapter 2: South Africa: From Exclusion to Inclusion

References

Infantry battalions of South Africa
Military units and formations of South Africa in the Border War
Military units and formations established in 1993
Military units and formations disestablished in 1997